Revolution Spring is the seventh studio album by the Detroit, Michigan punk rock band The Suicide Machines, released on March 27, 2020 by Fat Wreck Chords. It's the band's first album in 15 years, since 2005's War Profiteering Is Killing Us All.

Track listing

Critical reception 
The album was positively reviewed. New Noise Magazine wrote that the band picked up right where they left off 15 years ago with much "pent-up venting".

Personnel
Jason Navarro – vocals
Ryan Vandeberghe – drums
Rich Tschirhart – bass
Justin Malek – guitar

See also
List of 2020 albums

References

2020 albums
The Suicide Machines albums
Fat Wreck Chords albums